Huh may refer to:
 Huh (disfluency), a non-lexical element in speech
 Huh (god) or Heh, an Egyptian deity 
 huH (magazine), a defunct American magazine
 Huh (name) or Heo, a Korean family name
 "HuH" (song), a 2010 song by South Korean girl group 4minute
"Huh?", working title for the Spiritualized album Sweet Heart Sweet Light
 Huh?, a 1991 animated short film created by Mike Judge
 Harvard University Herbaria, a plant collection in Massachusetts
 Howard University Hospital, in Washington, D.C.
 Huahine – Fare Airport, in French Polynesia
 Huilliche language, an Araucanian language in Chile
 Hung Hom station, a railway station in Hong Kong